Peel Hospital was a health facility at Caddonfoot in the Scottish Borders, Scotland. It is a Category A Listed Building.

History
Peel House was designed by John Kinross and completed in 1904. In 1939 Peel Hospital was established as one of seven Emergency Hospital Service facilities for military casualties when Peel House was requisitioned from Lord Craigmyle. The wooden huts which had been erected during the war continued to be used for civilian purposes after the war. Additions included an administration block in 1949, a new operating theatre in 1957 and a new out‑patients facility in 1969. After services transferred to Borders General Hospital the hospital closed in 1988.

References

Defunct hospitals in Scotland
Hospitals in the Scottish Borders
Hospital buildings completed in 1904